Zvonko "Toni" Kurbos, better known as Tony Kurbos (born 20 October 1960) is a retired Slovenian-German football player who was a prolific striker, scoring almost 100 goals in his relatively short career.

He is perhaps most famous for scoring a hat-trick against Barcelona in Camp Nou, eliminating them in the first round of the 1984–85 Cup Winners' Cup with Metz, something that has been described in the British Guardian as the biggest European football upset ever.

In that same year, Kurbos assisted and scored in extra time of the Coupe de France final. In front of 45,000 spectators Metz won the match against Monaco 2–0, claiming their first major trophy ever.

Honours
FC Metz
Coupe de France: 1983–84

Individual
Ligue 2 Top Scorer: 1986–87

References

External links
 

1960 births
Living people
Yugoslav footballers
Slovenian footballers
German footballers
Stuttgarter Kickers players
FC Metz players
AS Saint-Étienne players
FC Mulhouse players
OGC Nice players
AS Monaco FC players
Ligue 1 players
Ligue 2 players
2. Bundesliga players
Sportspeople from Maribor
USL Dunkerque players
Expatriate footballers in France
Association football forwards
K.S.K. Tongeren players